Thomas Otis Murry (born May 8, 1977) is an American politician, state prosecutor, attorney, and pharmacist who served as a member of the North Carolina General Assembly representing the state's 41st House district in western Wake County between 2011 and 2015. He defeated incumbent Chris Heagarty in the 2010 general election and was defeated by Gale Adcock in the 2014 general election.

Early life and education 
Murry was born in Pine Bluff, Arkansas. He earned a Doctor of Pharmacy from the University of Arkansas and Juris Doctor from the Norman Adrian Wiggins School of Law at Campbell University.

Career
Murry served as an at-large member of the Morrisville Town Council for five years after winning elections in 2005 and 2009. Murry resigned his council seat to be sworn-in as a member of the North Carolina House of Representatives.

North Carolina House
In May 2010, Murry defeated Todd Batchelor in the Republican primary before facing Democrat Chris Heagarty for in the November general election. Heagarty had been appointed to the seat just months earlier by Gov. Bev Perdue to fill the remainder of the scandal-plagued term of Democratic Rep. Ty Harrell, who had recently resigned. Murry defeated Heagarty by a 54% to 46% margin.

Murry did not face a primary opponent in 2012. Murry defeated his November 2012 general election opponent, Jim Messina, by a 52-48 percent margin.

Tenure
In his first term as Representative of the 41st district, Murry was the primary sponsor of numerous bills involving medical or health care issues in North Carolina, including a GOP-led measure that sought to exempt North Carolina from the federal Affordable Care Act.

Murry was the primary sponsor of voter ID legislation and a regulatory reform bill that eliminated over 1400 regulations. 

The North Carolina Free Enterprise Foundation (NCFEF) called Murry the most pro-business freshman legislator in the NC State House in 2010.

Murry was ranked as the "Most Effective Freshman" in the North Carolina State House for the 2011-12 legislative session by the  North Carolina Center for Public Policy Research (NCCPPR).

Murry was ranked as the 10th most effective member of the North Carolina State House for the 2013-14 legislative session by NCCPPR.

Later career
Following the 2014 General Election, Murry became the Chief Legal Counsel to North Carolina Supreme Court Chief Justice Mark Martin in the administrative office of the NC Judicial Branch assisting the judiciary with legislative activities and strategic initiatives.

After leaving the NC Judicial Branch, Murry served as Chief of Client Services at the North Carolina Army National Guard at Joint Forces Headquarters. In this capacity, Captain Murry provided legal services to Soldiers, their families and military retirees ranging from estate planning, family law, consumer protection issues, and tax law. 

Since 2020, Murry has served as an assistant district attorney (prosecutor) in the Eleventh Prosecutorial District, comprising Franklin, Granville, Person, Vance, and Warren Counties

Electoral history

2014

2012

2010

References

External links

1977 births
Living people
People from Pine Bluff, Arkansas
People from Morrisville, North Carolina
University of Arkansas alumni
Campbell University alumni
21st-century American politicians
Democratic Party members of the North Carolina House of Representatives